Abisara abnormis or Abnormal Judy is a butterfly in the family Riodinidae. It is found in Burma and Assam.

References

Butterflies described in 1884
Abisara
Butterflies of Asia
Taxa named by Frederic Moore